Non-Prophets was a hip-hop duo consisting of rapper Sage Francis and producer Joe Beats.

History
The duo came to people's attention with their first effort, the Drop Bass / Bounce 12-inch single on Emerge Music in 1999. The follow-up release came in 2000 as the All Word, No Play single.

Shortly after Non-Prophets singles caught a buzz, Sage Francis verbally committed to the then up-and-coming label Anticon for the release of his first solo album. Until Personal Journals''' official unveiling in 2002, he self-released his Sick Of mixtapes which included Non-Prophets material.

Around the same time, Joe Beats created his first compilation of instrumentals, Reverse Discourse.  Here Joey introduces his unpaused/uninterrupted style of producing. With Sage Francis' help, the album saw the light of day on his Strange Famous Records.

Their debut album Hope was released on Lex Records in 2003. It was described by Pitchfork Media as "one of the year's finest," also receiving a positive review from CMJ New Music Monthly.Gladstone, Neil (2003) "Non-Prophets Hope", CMJ New Music Monthly, November 2003, p. 55, retrieved 2010-11-14 In early 2004, they toured the United States on Sage Francis' Fuck Clear Channel tour.

Today, the two are established as soloists. In 2004, Sage Francis signed to Epitaph Records. In 2010, his Li(f)e was the third and final record to come out on one of Epitaph's sister labels ANTI-.  In 2005, Joe Beats released Indie Rock Blues'' on Arbeid and 24-7 Records.

Discography

Albums

12” singles

References 

American hip hop groups
Hip hop duos
American musical duos
Musical groups from Rhode Island
Musical groups established in 1998
East Coast hip hop groups
Lex Records artists